Salzbergen is a railway station in Salzbergen, Germany. It is on the Almelo–Salzbergen and Emsland lines (Rheine - Norddeich). The train services are operated by WestfalenBahn.

Train services
The following services currently call at Salzbergen:

Regional services  Emden - Leer - Lingen (Ems) - Rheine - Münster
Regional services  Bad Bentheim - Rheine - Osnabrück - Herford - Bielefeld

Preserved locomotive

Steam Engine 043 196 is kept at Salzbergen station.

See also
 043 196 at Salzbergen
 WestfalenBahn at Salzbergen
 DB Class 111 at Salzbergen

References

Railway stations in Lower Saxony
Railway stations on the Almelo - Salzbergen railway line